Richard Smith Requa (March 27, 1881 – June 10, 1941) was an American architect, largely known for his work in San Diego, California. Requa was the Master Architect for the California Pacific International Exposition held in Balboa Park in 1935–36. He improved and extended many of the already existing buildings from an earlier exposition, as well as creating new facilities including the Old Globe Theater.

His own designs were predominantly in the Spanish Revival architectural style, occasionally blending them with American Craftsman influences, working to preserve San Diego's Spanish-influenced history. His firm, Requa and Jackson, were the architects of choice in San Diego during the 1920s, dominating the area with their "Southern California Style" that blended Mediterranean and Mission stylings.

Life and career
Requa was born in Rock Island, Illinois in 1881, and in 1900 at the age of 19 moved to San Diego, California with his parents. He died at the age of sixty on June 10, 1941, of a heart attack while working in his office, and is buried at Greenwood Memorial Park in San Diego. He was married in 1908 to Viola Hust in San Diego.

Requa made early use of home movies to capture architectural ideas on trips to Spain, the Mediterranean, Santa Cruz, San Francisco, Monterey, and the Pueblos of the Southwest.

He designed many landmark homes in the San Diego area, in addition to his work on the 1935 California Pacific International Exposition in Balboa Park. In 1925, Requa designed the Del Mar Castle in Del Mar, California for Ruth and Marston Harding, a home that later was owned by the McGaugh family 1950–1963, and then by the motivational speaker Tony Robbins. He was the architect for many of San Diego's historical landmarks in La Jolla as well as historical landmarks in the Point Loma area.  He also had an especially large influence on the character of the Kensington district of San Diego.

Notable works
The 1935 California Pacific International Exposition in Balboa Park, San Diego, California
The Old Globe Theatre in Balboa Park, San Diego, California
The San Diego County Administration Center (with other architects)
The initial layout of the city of Rancho Santa Fe, California, appointing Lilian Jeannette Rice as the lead planner in 1921
The St. Thomas Aquinas Chapel in Ojai, California
The original Torrey Pines Lodge, now the visitor center for Torrey Pines State Reserve
The Mount Helix Nature Theatre in La Mesa, California 
The Del Mar Castle, located at 544 Avenida Primavera, Del Mar, California
The D. E. Mann House, located at 1045 Loma Avenue, Coronado, California
The William A. Gunn House, located at 1127 F Avenue, Coronado, California
Requa's first home, built for himself in 1913, located in Mission Hills at 4346 Valle Vista, San Diego, California  
Requa's second home, built for himself in 1921, located in Loma Portal at 2906 Locust Street, San Diego, California
Furniture for the George W. Marston House, a museum and San Diego Landmark, located in Balboa Park

See also
Mediterranean Revival Style architecture
Mission Revival Style architecture
Category: Spanish Revival architecture
Spanish Revival architects
Spanish Colonial Revival architects
Spanish Colonial Revival architecture in California
Images of Revival styles of architecture

References

External links
Del Mar Castle
The San Diego Historical Society
History of Balboa Park

1881 births
1941 deaths
Architects from California
People from Rock Island, Illinois
People from San Diego
Spanish Revival architects
Spanish Colonial Revival architects
History of San Diego